The languages of Austria include German, the official language and lingua franca; Austro-Bavarian, the main dialect outside Vorarlberg; Alemannic, the main dialect in Vorarlberg; and several minority languages.

Standard German
German is the national official language and constitutes a lingua franca and de facto first language: most Austrians other than (mostly rural) seniors are able to speak it. It is the language used in media, in schools, and formal announcements. The variety of German used, Austrian German, is partially influenced by Austro-Bavarian.

Alemannic
Alemannic is spoken in Vorarlberg. Vorarlberg uses a High Alemannic, the same dialect group as that spoken in Northern Switzerland (outside Basel) and parts of southern Alsace, France. To most Germans and Austrians outside of Vorarlberg it is very difficult to understand, as it is more similar to Swiss German, with many grammatical and pronunciation differences.

Austro-Bavarian
The main native language of Austria outside Vorarlberg is Austro-Bavarian, whose many regionally different dialects are spoken. The north-eastern parts of Austria (with the capital Vienna) speak Central Austro-Bavarian dialects and the southern parts Southern Austro-Bavarian dialects. Austro-Bavarian differs greatly from Standard German, making it very difficult for German speakers of different regions to understand the native population. Austro-Bavarian has no official orthography, but there are literary efforts (:de:Dialektliteratur), especially in poems, to depict the sound of the pronunciation in the spelling. Other words can only be heard while visiting particular regions of Austria and Bavaria that are only rarely used in Standard German, including "Griaß God" (literally: "greet god" = may god greet you), and "Servus/Servas" (at your service) as greeting phrases, or are denoted as strictly dialectal, like "Pfiat di / Pfiat eich (euch)" (literally: "watch over you [God]" = may God watch over you) with the meaning of "goodbye".

Minority languages
A number of minority languages are spoken in Austria, some of which have official status.

Turkish
Turkish is the largest minority language, in a situation mirroring that of Germany, spoken by 2.3% of the population.

Serbian
Serbian is the second largest minority language, with usage by 2.2% of the population.

Burgenland Croatian
Burgenland Croatian, an official language in Austrian Burgenland, is spoken by 2.5% of Austrians, and Burgenland Croats are recognized as a minority and have enjoyed special rights following the Austrian State Treaty (Staatsvertrag) of 1955.

Hungarian
While little spoken today, Hungarian has traditionally held an important position in Austria due to the historical ties between the two countries. Today, Hungarian is spoken by around 1,000 people in Burgenland.

Slovene

Slovene is an official language in Austrian Carinthia.  Slovene is used by 12,686 Austrians as vernacular, and it is reported that Slovene can be spoken by 0.3% of Austrians. Carinthian Slovenes are recognized as a minority and have enjoyed special rights and affirmative action following the Austrian State Treaty (Staatsvertrag) of 1955.

European Charter for Regional or Minority Languages

Austria ratified the European Charter for Regional or Minority Languages on 28 June 2001 for the following languages in respect of specific Länder:

 Croatian of Burgenland
 Slovene (in Carinthia and Styria)
 Hungarian (in Burgenland and Vienna)
 Czech (in Vienna)
 Slovak (in Vienna)
 Romani (in Burgenland)

References

External links